The Vienna Convention for the Protection of the Ozone Layer is a multilateral environmental agreement signed in 1985 that provided frameworks for international reductions in the production of chlorofluorocarbons due to their contribution to the destruction of the ozone layer, resulting in an increased threat of skin cancer.

Background 
During the 1970s, research indicated that man-made chlorofluorocarbons (CFCs) reduce and convert ozone molecules in the atmosphere. CFCs are stable molecules composed of carbon, fluorine, and chlorine that were used prominently in products such as refrigerators. The threats associated with reduced ozone pushed the issue to the forefront of global climate issues and gained promotion through organizations such as the World Meteorological Organization and the United Nations. The Vienna Convention was agreed upon at the Vienna Conference of 1985 and entered into force in 1988. The Vienna Convention provided the framework necessary to create regulatory measures in the form of the Montreal Protocol.

In terms of universality, it is one of the most successful treaties of all time, having been ratified by 198 states (all United Nations members as well as the Holy See, the State of Palestine, Niue and the Cook Islands) as well as the European Union. While not a binding agreement, it acts as a framework for the international efforts to protect the ozone layer; however, it does not include legally binding reduction goals for the use of CFCs, the main chemical agents causing ozone depletion.

Provisions 
The treaty's provisions include the international sharing of climate and atmospheric research to promote knowledge of the effects on the ozone layer. In addition, the treaty calls for the adoption of international agencies to assess the harmful effects of depleted ozone and the promotion of policies that regulate the production of harmful substances that influence the ozone layer. One of the outcomes of the Vienna Convention was the creation of a panel of governmental atmospheric experts known as the Meeting of Ozone Research Managers, which assesses ozone depletion and climate change research and produces a report for the Conference of Parties (COP). Additionally, the COP utilizes the data assessed to suggest new policies aimed at limiting CFC emissions.

Currently, the COP meets every three years and coordinates with the timing of a similar meeting rendered under the Montreal Protocol. The Ozone Secretariat functions as an administrator of the COP, Montreal Meeting of Parties (MOP), and Open-Ended Working Groups that help facilitate functions under the convention. A Multilateral Fund exists to aid developing nations transition from ozone-depleting chemicals using guidelines under the convention, which is administered by a Multilateral Fund Secretariat. The Multilateral Fund has aided thousands of projects in nearly 150 countries, preventing the usage of roughly 250,000 tons of ozone-depleting chemicals.

References

External links
UNEP: The Ozone Secretariat website
Ratifications 
Treaty text
 Introductory note by Edith Brown Weiss, procedural history note and audiovisual material on the Vienna Convention for the Protection of the Ozone Layer in the Historic Archives of the United Nations Audiovisual Library of International Law
Vienna Convention for the Protection of the Ozone Layer , Treaty available in ECOLEX-the gateway to environmental law (English)

Environmental treaties
Treaties concluded in 1985
Treaties entered into force in 1988
Ozone depletion
1988 in the environment
Treaties of the Afghan Transitional Administration
Treaties of Albania
Treaties of Algeria
Treaties of Andorra
Treaties of Angola
Treaties of Antigua and Barbuda
Treaties of Argentina
Treaties of Armenia
Treaties of Australia
Treaties of Austria
Treaties of Azerbaijan
Treaties of the Bahamas
Treaties of Bahrain
Treaties of Bangladesh
Treaties of Barbados
Treaties of the Byelorussian Soviet Socialist Republic
Treaties of Belgium
Treaties of Belize
Treaties of Benin
Treaties of Bhutan
Treaties of Bolivia
Treaties of Bosnia and Herzegovina
Treaties of Botswana
Treaties of Brazil
Treaties of Brunei
Treaties of Bulgaria
Treaties of Burkina Faso
Treaties of Burundi
Treaties of Cambodia
Treaties of Cameroon
Treaties of Canada
Treaties of Cape Verde
Treaties of the Central African Republic
Treaties of Chad
Treaties of Chile
Treaties of the People's Republic of China
Treaties of Colombia
Treaties of the Comoros
Treaties of the Republic of the Congo
Treaties of the Cook Islands
Treaties of Costa Rica
Treaties of Ivory Coast
Treaties of Croatia
Treaties of Cuba
Treaties of Cyprus
Treaties of the Czech Republic
Treaties of Czechoslovakia
Treaties of North Korea
Treaties of Zaire
Treaties of Denmark
Treaties of Djibouti
Treaties of Dominica
Treaties of the Dominican Republic
Treaties of Ecuador
Treaties of Egypt
Treaties of El Salvador
Treaties of Equatorial Guinea
Treaties of Eritrea
Treaties of Estonia
Treaties of the Transitional Government of Ethiopia
Treaties of Fiji
Treaties of Finland
Treaties of France
Treaties of Gabon
Treaties of the Gambia
Treaties of Georgia (country)
Treaties of West Germany
Treaties of East Germany
Treaties of Ghana
Treaties of Greece
Treaties of Grenada
Treaties of Guatemala
Treaties of Guinea
Treaties of Guinea-Bissau
Treaties of Guyana
Treaties of Haiti
Treaties of Honduras
Treaties of Hungary
Treaties of Iceland
Treaties of India
Treaties of Indonesia
Treaties of Iran
Treaties of Iraq
Treaties of Ireland
Treaties of Israel
Treaties of Italy
Treaties of Jamaica
Treaties of Japan
Treaties of Jordan
Treaties of Kazakhstan
Treaties of Kenya
Treaties of Kiribati
Treaties of Kuwait
Treaties of Kyrgyzstan
Treaties of Laos
Treaties of Latvia
Treaties of Lebanon
Treaties of Lesotho
Treaties of Liberia
Treaties of the Libyan Arab Jamahiriya
Treaties of Liechtenstein
Treaties of Lithuania
Treaties of Luxembourg
Treaties of Madagascar
Treaties of Malawi
Treaties of Malaysia
Treaties of the Maldives
Treaties of Mali
Treaties of Malta
Treaties of the Marshall Islands
Treaties of Mauritania
Treaties of Mauritius
Treaties of Mexico
Treaties of the Federated States of Micronesia
Treaties of Monaco
Treaties of Mongolia
Treaties of Montenegro
Treaties of Morocco
Treaties of Mozambique
Treaties of Myanmar
Treaties of Namibia
Treaties of Nauru
Treaties of Nepal
Treaties of the Netherlands
Treaties of New Zealand
Treaties of Nicaragua
Treaties of Niger
Treaties of Nigeria
Treaties of Niue
Treaties of Norway
Treaties of Oman
Treaties of Pakistan
Treaties of Palau
Treaties of Panama
Treaties of Papua New Guinea
Treaties of Paraguay
Treaties of Peru
Treaties of the Philippines
Treaties of Poland
Treaties of Portugal
Treaties of Qatar
Treaties of South Korea
Treaties of Moldova
Treaties of Romania
Treaties of the Soviet Union
Treaties of Rwanda
Treaties of Samoa
Treaties of San Marino
Treaties of São Tomé and Príncipe
Treaties of Saudi Arabia
Treaties of Senegal
Treaties of Serbia and Montenegro
Treaties of Seychelles
Treaties of Sierra Leone
Treaties of Singapore
Treaties of Slovakia
Treaties of Slovenia
Treaties of the Solomon Islands
Treaties of the Transitional National Government of Somalia
Treaties of South Africa
Treaties of South Sudan
Treaties of Spain
Treaties of Sri Lanka
Treaties of Saint Kitts and Nevis
Treaties of Saint Lucia
Treaties of Saint Vincent and the Grenadines
Treaties of the Republic of the Sudan (1985–2011)
Treaties of Suriname
Treaties of Eswatini
Treaties of Sweden
Treaties of Switzerland
Treaties of Syria
Treaties of Tajikistan
Treaties of Thailand
Treaties of North Macedonia
Treaties of East Timor
Treaties of Togo
Treaties of Tonga
Treaties of Trinidad and Tobago
Treaties of Tunisia
Treaties of Turkey
Treaties of Turkmenistan
Treaties of Tuvalu
Treaties of Uganda
Treaties of the Ukrainian Soviet Socialist Republic
Treaties of the United Arab Emirates
Treaties of the United Kingdom
Treaties of Tanzania
Treaties of the United States
Treaties of Uruguay
Treaties of Uzbekistan
Treaties of Vanuatu
Treaties of Venezuela
Treaties of Vietnam
Treaties of Yemen
Treaties of Yugoslavia
Treaties of Zambia
Treaties of Zimbabwe
Treaties of the Holy See
Treaties entered into by the European Union
United Nations treaties
1985 in Austria
Treaties extended to the Netherlands Antilles
Treaties extended to Aruba
Treaties extended to the Cook Islands
Treaties extended to Niue
Treaties extended to Jersey
Treaties extended to the Isle of Man
Treaties extended to Anguilla
Treaties extended to Bermuda
Treaties extended to the British Antarctic Territory
Treaties extended to the British Indian Ocean Territory
Treaties extended to the British Virgin Islands
Treaties extended to the Cayman Islands
Treaties extended to the Falkland Islands
Treaties extended to Gibraltar
Treaties extended to Montserrat
Treaties extended to the Pitcairn Islands
Treaties extended to Saint Helena, Ascension and Tristan da Cunha
Treaties extended to South Georgia and the South Sandwich Islands
Treaties extended to the Turks and Caicos Islands
Treaties extended to Akrotiri and Dhekelia
Treaties extended to Guernsey
Treaties extended to Greenland
Treaties extended to the Faroe Islands
Treaties extended to British Hong Kong
Treaties extended to Portuguese Macau